Mir Sayyid Muhammad Nurbakhsh Qahistani (1392-1464) was a mystic (Sufi) who gave name to the Noorbakshia school of Islam. He wrote al Fiqh al-Ahwat (Islamic Jurisprudence) and Kitab al-Aetiqadia (Book of Faith).

Life

Nurbakhsh's real name was Muhammad bin Abdullah. His father was born in Qain and his grandfather in al-Hasa, whence in some ghazals (lyrics) he styles himself as Lahsavi (one from al-Hasa). His father migrated from Bahrain to Qain in Qahistan, where Nurbakhsh was born in 795 A.H. (1393 C.E.). Thus his full name as appeared in his prose works is Sayyid Muhammad Nurbakhsh Qahistani.

Nurbakhsh became a disciple of Sayyid Ishaq al-Khatlani, himself a disciple of Mir Sayyid Ali Hamadani. Through his writings Nurbakhsh made an attempt to bridge the gap between the orthodox Sunni'ism and Shi'ism and gave an Islamic Fiqh of religious moderation in his book titled Al-Fiqh al-Ahwat (Moderate Islamic Jurisprudence).

His tomb is in Suleqan near Tehran.

Works
Syed Muhammad Nurbakhsh wrote of about 150 works in Arabic or Persian.

 Al-Fiqh Al-Ahwat (Islamic Jurisprudence)
 Kitab al-Aetiqadia (Book of Faith)
 Silsila Dhahab (in Arabic and Persian)
 Risal fi Ilm Firasat or Insan-nama
 Kashf al-Haqaeeq
 Risala Maash al-Salikeen
 Makarim al-Akhlaq
 Silsila al-Auliya (Arabic)
 Risala Nooria or Nur al-Haq
 Risala Miraajia (Persian)
 Risal al Huda (Arabic)
 Risala Irfani (Persian)
 Risala Aqsam-e-Dil (Persian)

See also
Haji Bektash Veli

References

External links
 Sufia Nurbakhshia: Messianic Hopes and Mystical Visions, Shahzad Bashir - 2003

Sufi mystics
Iranian Sufi saints
Iranian Sufis
1339 births
Year of death missing
History of Kashmir
Sufism in India